MS Gotenland was most notably a cargo ship used during World War II by Nazi Germany, but was later a Norwegian vessel and then a Greek vessel. The ship is known in Norway for being used during the deportation of 158 Norwegian Jews to Germany in 1943. In 1945 the ship was seized by the invading Allied powers and returned to Norway who later put it back into service under the name Hopeville. In 1967 Hopeville was sold to a Greek shipping company named  Argyros and was renamed Oinoussian Hope. in 1968 it was again renamed, this time to Esperanza. In 1970 the ship arrived in Shanghai for ship breaking.

While under German control the ship sailed for the shipping company Norddeutscher Lloyd, and was piloted by Captain Heinz Vollmers.

Construction 
The vessel was constructed by Burmeister & Wain in Copenhagen, Denmark and was originally intended for Klaveness & Co who was based out of Lysaker, Oslo, but after the Nazis invaded Denmark and Norway in 1940 the German state became the intended recipient. The ship had 4 cargo holds with 5 hatches. 15 booms; 1 x 25 h, 14 x 5 h. and 15 winches. The ship's gross tonnage was 5,281 brt. The ship was equipped with one diesel engine which was 2-stroke / single TV, 9-cylinder, awl. dim: 620 x 1,150 mm. 4,500 BHK at 122 rpm. the top speed was 13.5 Knots and the storage capacity was 1038 tons. Gotenland was delivered to Norddeutscher in 1942 who managed it on behalf of Germany.

The deportation of Norwegian Jews 
Detained Jews in Norway had already been sent to camps in German-occupied Poland with the ships Danube and Monte Rosa. Gotenland became the third ship known for its role in the deportation of Norwegian Jews.

On February 24, 1943, a total of 158 Jewish prisoners were transferred from Bredtveit and Grini to Gotenland, which was located in the port of Oslo. Of these, 71 were adult women, 63 adult men and 24 children born in 1924 or later. The loading took all day, so that the ship did not leave Oslo until the morning after five o'clock. The Gestapo officer Klaus Grossmann led the German guard force on board the Gotenland during the transport. 

The voyage's destination was Szczecin in Germany (today Szczecin is in Poland), where the ship docked on the morning of 27 February. The prisoners were housed in freight cars and then sent on to Berlin. Once in Berlin  they were forced to sign over all of their assets to the German state. The next day they were sent on to Auschwitz. Upon arrival in Auschwitz, all men under 18 and over approx. 45-50 years and almost all women were separated from the group, they were then immediately executed in the gas chambers. 26-28 of the transported Norwegians survived the first day, they were forced to work in Monowitz-Buna. Only six or seven of the prisoners transported with Gotenland survived the war.

Libau 
On January 29, 1945 Gotenland suffered substantial damages off the coast of Libau (the german name for Liepāja) after being hit by a bomb during an air raid. Gotenland was forced to return to Danzig for repairs to the decking and forecastle.

MV Wilhelm Gustloff 
On January 30, 1945, after the Soviet submarine S-13 sunk the MV Wilhelm Gustloff, MS Gotenland (still damaged from the bombing in Libau) played a role in rescuing some of the survivors in the water, but it is estimated that 9,343 out of more than 10,600 on board still died.

References

Nazi Germany
The Holocaust in Norway
Deportation
World War II
World War II ships
